Chow Mei-nam (born 14 November 1988) is a Hong Kong rugby union player. Chow made her international debut for Hong Kong in 2015 against Japan. She captained Hong Kong in their first World Cup appearance in 2017.

Biography 
Chow is a P.E. teacher at Hotung Secondary School. After the 2017 World Cup she spent some time in New Zealand and played for College Rifles RFC. She made her rugby sevens debut at the Olympic Repechage tournament in Monaco in 2021.

Chow was named in the squad that played in a two-test series against Kazakhstan in December 2022.

References 

1988 births
Living people
Hong Kong people
Hong Kong rugby union players
Hong Kong female rugby union players
Hong Kong female rugby sevens players